The Ste. Genevieve Formation is a geologic formation in Kentucky. It preserves fossils dating back to the Carboniferous period.

See also

 List of fossiliferous stratigraphic units in Kentucky

References
 

Carboniferous Indiana
Carboniferous Kentucky
Carboniferous southern paleotropical deposits